Steven A. Cohen (born June 11, 1956) is an American hedge fund manager and owner of the New York Mets of Major League Baseball since September 14, 2020, owning roughly 97.2% of the team. He is the founder of hedge fund Point72 Asset Management and now-closed S.A.C. Capital Advisors, both based in Stamford, Connecticut.

In 2013, the Cohen-founded S.A.C. Capital Advisors pleaded guilty to insider trading and agreed to pay $1.8 billion in fines ($900 million in forfeiture and $900 million in fines) in one of the biggest criminal cases against a hedge fund. Cohen was prohibited from managing outside money for two years as part of the settlement reached in the civil case over his accountability for the scandal. The hedge fund agreed to plead guilty to wire fraud and four counts of securities fraud and to close to outside investors.

Cohen loosely inspired the character Bobby Axelrod, played by Damian Lewis, on the Showtime series Billions.

Early life and education
Cohen grew up in Great Neck, New York, where his father was a dress manufacturer in Manhattan's garment district, and his mother was a piano teacher. He is the third of seven brothers and sisters. He took a liking to poker as a high school student, often betting his own money in tournaments, and credits the game with teaching him "how to take risks." Cohen graduated from John L. Miller Great Neck North High School in 1974, where he played on the school's soccer team.

Cohen received an economics degree from the Wharton School at the University of Pennsylvania in 1978. While in school, Cohen was initiated as a brother of Zeta Beta Tau fraternity's Theta chapter where he served as treasurer. While in school, a friend helped him open a brokerage account with $1,000 of his tuition money.

Investment career

Gruntal & Co. (1978–1992)
In 1978, after graduating from Wharton, Cohen got a Wall Street job as a junior trader in the options arbitrage department at Gruntal & Co. His first day on the job at Gruntal & Co., he made an $8,000 profit. He would eventually go on to make the company around $100,000 a day and eventually managed a $75 million portfolio and six traders. Cohen was running his own trading group at Gruntal & Co. by 1984, and continued running it until he started his own company, SAC in 1992.

Throughout the late 1980s, the Securities and Exchange Commission became suspicious that Cohen had used inside information in December 1985 when he bet that RCA and GE would merge, ahead of the announcement. The SEC called him to testify, but he refused to answer any questions, invoking his right against self-incrimination. Then, the SEC started looking into his other investments from the same period, especially those involving Brett K. Lurie.

S.A.C. Capital Advisors (1992–2016)
In 1992, Cohen started S.A.C. Capital Advisors with $10 million of his own money and another $10 million from outside capital. The company's name 'SAC Capital' derived from Steven A. Cohen's initials.

In 2003, the New York Times wrote that "SAC is one of the biggest hedge funds and is known for frequent and rapid trading." In 2006, The Wall Street Journal reported that while Cohen was once a rapid-fire trader who never held trading positions for extended periods of time, he now holds an increasing number of equities for longer periods of time.

As of 2009, the firm managed $14 billion in equity.

Racketeering and insider trading charges
In December 2009, Cohen and his brother Donald T. Cohen were sued by Steven's ex-wife Patricia Cohen for racketeering and insider trading charges. On March 30, 2011, the United States District Court in Lower Manhattan dismissed the case, but on April 3, 2013, the 2nd U.S. Circuit Court of Appeals in New York said a lower court had erred in dismissing fraud-based claims by his former spouse and revived the lawsuit. The appeals court also revived claims of racketeering and breach of fiduciary duty while upholding the dismissal of an unjust enrichment claim.

Writing for a three-judge panel, Circuit Judge Pierre N. Leval said Patricia Cohen had made a "plausible" allegation that Steven Cohen had concealed the $5.5 million during negotiations on a separation agreement in 1989, which preceded the divorce. The revival of the lawsuit comes amid mounting pressure on Steven Cohen over an insider trading investigation that led to the arrest of Michael Steinberg, one of Cohen's closest confidantes at SAC Capital. SAC affiliates reached two civil insider trading settlements totaling nearly $616 million with the U.S. Securities and Exchange Commission. SAC neither admitted nor denied wrongdoing in either case.

SEC investigation (2012–2016)
On November 20, 2012, Cohen was implicated in an alleged insider trading scandal involving an ex-SAC manager, Mathew Martoma. The SEC brought charges against a number of other S.A.C. employees from 2010 to 2013 with various outcomes. Martoma was convicted in 2014, in what federal prosecutors billed as the most profitable insider-trading conspiracy in history. The SEC later brought a civil lawsuit against Cohen, alleging his failure to supervise Martoma and Michael Steinberg, who was a senior employee and confidant of Cohen's. Cohen settled his civil case with regulators in January 2016; the agreement with the SEC prohibited Cohen from managing outside money until 2018.

S.A.C. Capital Advisors "pleaded guilty to insider trading charges in 2013 and paid $1.8 billion in penalties" and was required to stop handling investments for outsiders. Cohen "escaped criminal indictment himself despite being the living, breathing heart of S.A.C. Capital," but Dr. Sidney Gilman, the star prosecution witness against Martoma, testified that FBI agents told him that Cohen was the investigation's ultimate target. He was featured in a January 2017 The New Yorker article titled "When the Feds Went After the Hedge-Fund Legend Steven A. Cohen".

Point72 Ventures (2014–present)
In 2014, Cohen founded Point72 Ventures, "a venture capital fund that makes early-stage investments".

GameStop short squeeze
In January 2021, Cohen's hedge fund Point72 joined Ken Griffin's Citadel in putting $2.75 billion into Melvin Capital, the hedge fund of former Cohen protege Gabe Plotkin, as a result of the GameStop short squeeze. Cohen was criticized by Barstool Sports founder Dave Portnoy for his role, to which Cohen responded that he was just "trying to make a living" via Twitter; Cohen's behavior in this exchange was subsequently criticized by former New York sports icon Boomer Esiason, who said Cohen's comment "actually makes me sick to my stomach." When asked by a New York Mets fan on Twitter, Cohen denied that his involvement with the short squeeze would have an effect on his willingness to spend money on the team, namely in the ongoing free agent signing period. Cohen deactivated his Twitter account on the evening of January 29, 2021, purportedly an action taken by Cohen himself. Cohen later stated that he stepped away from the platform due to an influx of threats against himself and his family.

Wealth
In 2016, Forbes Magazine estimated Cohen's fortune at $13 billion, ranking him the 30th richest person in the United States. Cohen was dubbed "the hedge fund king" in a 2006 The Wall Street Journal article. His 2005 compensation was reportedly $1 billion, considerably higher than his 2001 compensation of $428 million. In February 2015, Forbes listed Cohen as the highest-earning hedge fund manager in 2014. In December 2013, Cohen's New York penthouse in the Bloomberg Tower was listed for sale for $98 million. According to Institutional Investor, Cohen made an estimated $1.7 billion in 2020.

New York Mets
Cohen became a minority owner of the New York Mets of Major League Baseball (MLB) in 2012, with an 8% stake in the baseball team. On August 27, 2020, news sources announced that Cohen had entered into exclusive negotiations with Fred Wilpon and Saul Katz to buy a controlling interest in the Mets. On September 14, 2020, an agreement was made to give Cohen majority control of the Mets, pending approval from MLB owners. On October 20, MLB's ownership committee approved the Mets' sale to Cohen, awaiting final approval. On October 30, MLB owners officially approved the sale, making Cohen the new majority owner of the Mets and the richest owner in baseball. On November 6, Cohen closed out the deal with Sterling Equities to officially become the new owner of the team.

Cohen has also been active on Twitter, often taking suggestions from fans on how to improve the Mets baseball experience or giving his opinions on news around Major League Baseball. Cohen briefly deactivated the account in January 2021 in relation to his involvement with the GameStop short squeeze fallout. He later re-activated his account on February 23, 2021.

Philanthropy
Cohen has given $715 million to philanthropic causes throughout his life, including to charitable causes relating to veterans and children's health.

Cohen serves on the board of trustees of the New York-based Robin Hood Foundation.

Via the Steven & Alexandra Cohen Foundation, the Cohens have donated to projects involved in health, education, arts and culture, and the New York community. In 2014, the Cohen Foundation provided funding, via the New York University Langone Center, for the study of post-traumatic stress and traumatic brain injury. The foundation gave a grant in excess of $100,000 to the Bruce Museum of Arts and Science in 2014. In 2019, the foundation contributed $50 million of the more than $400 million raised for the New York Museum of Modern Art. The museum announced in 2017 that MoMA's largest contiguous gallery will be called the Steven and Alexandra Cohen Center for Special Exhibitions. Cohen is on the board of the MoMa and LA MOCA.

In April 2016, Cohen announced the creation and a commitment of $275 million to the Cohen Veterans Network. The CVN's goal is to establish mental health centers for veterans and their families throughout the U.S. The goal is the establishment of 20–25 centers by 2020.

Cohen Veterans Bioscience, also funded by Cohen, conducts research into the effects of posttraumatic stress disorder on combat veterans.

Politics
In 2015, Steven Cohen and his wife, Alexandra, donated $2.25 million to a Super PAC called America Leads that supported Chris Christie's presidential candidacy.

In 2017, Cohen contributed $1 million to Donald Trump's inauguration.

In 2021, Cohen donated $500,000 to a Super PAC supporting Andrew Yang's candidacy in the 2021 New York City Democratic mayoral primary, and a further $1.5 million to a Super PAC supporting Eric Adams.

Art collection
Cohen's art collection is reported to be worth around $1 billion.

The New York Times reported that Cohen began seriously collecting art in 2000. Cohen's tastes and collection began with Impressionist painters, acquiring works by Manet and Monet, after which he moved quickly into contemporary art.

While he has collected works from important emerging artists such as Adam Pendleton, he is most famous for collecting 'trophy' art, signature works by famous artists, including a Pollock drip painting from David Geffen for $52 million and Damien Hirst's The Physical Impossibility of Death in the Mind of Someone Living, a piece that the artist had bought back from Charles Saatchi for $8 million.

In 2006, Cohen attempted to make the most expensive art purchase in history when he offered to purchase Picasso's Le Rêve from casino mogul Steve Wynn for $139 million. Just days before the painting was to be transported to Cohen, Wynn, who suffers from poor vision due to retinitis pigmentosa, accidentally thrust his elbow through the painting while showing it to a group of acquaintances inside of his office at Wynn Las Vegas. The purchase was canceled, and Wynn kept the painting until early November 2012, when Cohen finally acquired the painting for $150 million.

In May 2019, Cohen bought Jeff Koons's Rabbit for $91.1 million; the purchase was made through Robert Mnuchin and was the most expensive work sold by a living artist at auction at the time.

Cohen owns or has owned artworks by Lucio Fontana, Alberto Giacometti, Willem de Kooning, Jeff Koons, Edvard Munch, Pablo Picasso, and Andy Warhol. In 2015, he reportedly bought the world's most expensive sculpture, Alberto Giacometti's Man Pointing. In November 2015, his art collection was estimated to be at about $1 billion. Cohen is reportedly building a private museum for some of his artwork on his Greenwich property. Cohen had also placed Marc Quinn's Self, a head sculpture made of frozen blood, in the SAC lobby.

Legacy and awards 
In 2008 he was inducted into the Institutional Investors Alpha's Hedge Fund Manager Hall of Fame along with Alfred Jones, Bruce Kovner, David Swensen, George Soros, Jack Nash, James Simons, Julian Robertson, Kenneth Griffin, Leon Levy, Louis Bacon, Michael Steinhardt, Paul Tudor Jones and Seth Klarman.

Family 
Cohen has been married twice. In 1979, he married Patricia Finke, a New York native from a working-class background who grew up in the Washington Heights, Manhattan neighborhood of New York City. They have two children together. They divorced in 1990.

In 1991 Cohen met Alexandra Garcia, a single mother of Puerto Rican descent. Garcia grew up in Washington Heights, moving there from her original home in the projects of Harlem. They met through a dating service and was described that she "always wanted to marry a millionaire".

See also 
 List of University of Pennsylvania people

References

External links
 To Catch a Trader – PBS Frontline documentary
 When Wall Street Writes Its Own Rules
 
 
 Steven Cohen Accused of Failing to Prevent Insider Trading 
 "A New Prince of Wall Street Buys Up Art" – New York Times 2005 article profiling Cohen's art collection
 Steven & Alexandra Cohen Foundation – official website
 Steven Cohen’s Past Re-emerges to Cast Doubt on His Updated Image

1956 births
Living people
American art collectors
American billionaires
American financiers
American financial company founders
American investors
American money managers
American financial analysts
American hedge fund managers
Businesspeople from Greenwich, Connecticut
Insider trading
Jewish American baseball people
Jewish American philanthropists
Jewish American sportspeople
New York Mets owners
People from Great Neck, New York
Philanthropists from New York (state)
Stock and commodity market managers
Wharton School of the University of Pennsylvania alumni
20th-century American Jews
21st-century American Jews